Santa Maria La Nova is a hamlet (frazione) of the comune of Campagna in the Province of Salerno, Campania, Italy.

History

Geography
Santa Maria La Nova is situated near the Ripalta Mountain and very close to the town of Eboli, separated from its municipality by the little river Ausella.

See also
Campagna
Camaldoli
Puglietta
Quadrivio
Romandola-Madonna del Ponte
Serradarce

Frazioni of the Province of Salerno
Localities of Cilento